Gregg Mayles (born 29 April) is a British video game designer currently working for video game company Rare as creative director. He is one of the longest-serving members of the company, having worked there since 1989.

Career

Mayles began his career as a designer of the Battletoads series and the Donkey Kong Country series and was one of the creators of the characters Diddy Kong and King K. Rool. After his work on DKC, he came up with an idea about an action-adventure game influenced by his recent work on the series. The project was greenlit for release first on the Super Nintendo Entertainment System and then on the Nintendo 64. Codenamed Project Dream, the game was to be about a boy who went up on a magical adventure to a pirate island. The concept was scrapped, and the hero was changed to bear based on one from Diddy Kong Racing with a backpack, with the latter winnowed by Mayles's trip to Japan. There went the critically acclaimed Banjo-Kazooie series.

After the success of Banjo-Kazooie, Mayles did additional design on Donkey Kong 64, which was based on the concept of Mayles's project. Then, Mayles directed the long-awaited sequel, Banjo-Tooie, which was even more acclaimed than its predecessor. After Banjo-Tooie, Mayles did design on Conker's Bad Fur Day and Star Fox Adventures. Mayles directed the design of the 2003 game Grabbed by the Ghoulies, which was reviewed poorly by the press. The game's protagonist, Cooper, resembles Mayles himself. Then he worked on some other projects before playing a key role in creating the game Viva Piñata. It first came to life as an idea from Tim Stamper, and then it resulted in a full game influenced by the Animal Crossing and Story of Seasons series. It was released in 2006 and was well received. Mayles also took part in designing its sequel, Viva Piñata: Trouble in Paradise.

In 2006, Mayles decided to come back to his roots, and started a new Banjo-Kazooie project with a new feature: car building. It was announced at X06, and was titled Banjo-Kazooie: Nuts & Bolts. The game was released in 2008. After Nuts & Bolts, Mayles did work on the Xbox 360 version of Sonic & Sega All-Stars Racing and on Kinect Sports. Mayles also served as the creative director for 2018's Sea of Thieves; one of the in-game songs is named in his honour.

In 2007, Tim and Chris Stamper left Rare to "pursue other opportunities", and Mark Betteridge along with Mayles replaced them as studio director and creative director, respectively. Mayles also donates money for poor children. He started a "Very Purple Marathon" in April 2009. The marathon was supported by Rare itself, donating 2,110 euros. His younger brother is video game artist Steve Mayles, who also worked at Rare from 1992 to 2014.

Works

References

External links
 
 Gregg Mayles on MobyGames
 
 Gregg Mayles on Giant Bomb
 A Very Purple Marathon's site
 Mayles's article at Rare Witch Project Wiki

Interviews
B-K: Nuts and Bolts: Q&A from Gregg Mayles.
Mayles comments on Ensemble Studio's closure and Peter Moore's accusation on Rare as outdated company.
Article "Building Your Own Banjo".

Year of birth unknown
British video game designers
Rare (company) people
Nintendo people
British businesspeople
Living people
Banjo-Kazooie
People from Coalville
British video game directors
Year of birth missing (living people)